Dechristianisation, de-Christianization, or dechristianize may also refer to:

Secularization
Dechristianisation of France during the French Revolution.
Conversion of non-Muslim places of worship into mosques
Dechristianize (album), of 2003 by U.S. death metal band Vital Remains